Elizabeth May (born 1954), Canadian politician, leader of the Green Party of Canada.

Elizabeth May may also refer to:

 Elizabeth May (triathlete) (born 1983), triathlete from Luxembourg
 Elizabeth May (South Dakota politician) (born 1961), member of the South Dakota House of Representatives
 Elizabeth Stoffregen May (1907–2011), economist, academic and advocate of education for women